Gestalt pattern matching, also Ratcliff/Obershelp pattern recognition, is a string-matching algorithm for determining the similarity of two strings. It was developed in 1983 by John W. Ratcliff and John A. Obershelp and published in the Dr. Dobb's Journal in July 1988.

Algorithm 
The matching characters are defined as the longest common substring plus recursively the number of matching characters in the non-matching regions on both sides of the longest common substring:

where the similarity metric can take a value between zero and one:

The value of 1 stands for the complete match of the two strings, whereas the value of 0 means there is no match and not even one common letter.

Sample

The longest common substring is WIKIM (grey) with 5 characters. There is no further substring on the left. The non-matching substrings on the right side are EDIA and ANIA. They again have a longest common substring IA (dark gray) with length 2.
The similarity metric is determined by:

Properties

Complexity 
By changing the computing method, the execution time can be improved significantly.

Commutative property 
It can be shown, that the gestalt pattern matching algorithm is not commutative: 

Sample
For the two strings

and

the metric result for 

Applications 
The Python difflib library, which was introduced in version 2.1, implements a similar algorithm that predates the Ratcliff-Obershelp algorithm. Due to the unfavourable runtime behaviour of this similarity metric, three methods have been implemented. Two of them return an upper bound in a faster execution time. The fastest variant only compares the length of the two substrings:

 ,

# Drqr Implementation in Python
def real_quick_ratio(s1: str, s2: str) -> float:
    """Return an upper bound on ratio() very quickly."""
    l1, l2 = len(s1), len(s2)
    length = l1 + l2

    if not length:
        return 1.0

    return 2.0 * min(l1, l2) / length

The second upper bound calculates twice the sum of all used characters  which occur in  divided by the length of both strings but the sequence is ignored.

 ,

# Dqr Implementation in Python
def quick_ratio(s1: str, s2: str) -> float:
    """Return an upper bound on ratio() relatively quickly."""
    length = len(s1) + len(s2)

    if not length:
        return 1.0

    intersect = collections.Counter(s1) & collections.Counter(s2)
    matches = sum(intersect.values())
    return 2.0 * matches / length

Trivially the following applies:
  and
 .

References

Further reading

See also 
 Pattern matching

Search algorithms
Information theory
Quantitative linguistics
Recursion
String metrics
Articles with example Python (programming language) code